Akbarisovo (Aqbarıś) is a rural locality (a selo) and the administrative centre of Akbarisovsky Selsoviet, Sharansky District, Bashkortostan, Russia. The population was 437 as of 2010. There are 6 streets.

Geography 
Akbarisovo is located 18 km northeast of Sharan (the district's administrative centre) by road. Novotavlarovo is the nearest rural locality.

References 

Rural localities in Sharansky District